Iye may refer to:
 6413 Iye, a main-belt asteroid
 IYE, the ICAO airline designator of "Yemenia", the national airline of Yemen
 Iye Abarim, one of the places where the Israelites stopped at during the Exodus
 İye (sometimes İne or Eğe) a spirit from Turkic mythology
 Od iye (or Od iyesi), the Turkic and Mongolian spirit or deity of fire

People 
 Iye Mackay, 4th of Strathnaver (died 1370), a chief of the ancient Scottish clan
 Iye Roy Mackay, 10th of Strathnaver (died 1517), a chief of the ancient Scottish clan
 Iye Du Mackay, 12th of Strathnaver, a chief of the ancient Scottish clan from 1550 to 1572
 Iye Idolorusan, Nigerian ruler

See also